Alappuzha Lok Sabha constituency is one of the 20 Lok Sabha (parliamentary) constituencies in Kerala state in southern India.

Assembly segments

Alappuzha Lok Sabha constituency is composed of the following assembly segments:

Members of Parliament

As Alleppey in Travancore-Cochin

As Ambalappuzha

As Alappuzha

Election results

General election 2019
According to Election Commission, there are 13,14,535 registered voters in Alappuzha Constituency for 2019 Lok Sabha Election.

General election 2014

See also
 Alappuzha
 List of Constituencies of the Lok Sabha
 Indian general election, 2014 (Kerala)
 2014 Indian general election

References

External links
 Election Commission India
 DELIMITATION OF CONSTITUENCY-2008
2019 General Election Alappuzha Constituency Live Results

Lok Sabha constituencies in Kerala
Politics of Alappuzha district